Thure Bergvall (23 November 1887 – 20 September 1950) was a Swedish long-distance runner. He competed in the marathon at the 1906 and 1912 Summer Olympics.

References

External links
 

1887 births
1950 deaths
Athletes (track and field) at the 1906 Intercalated Games
Athletes (track and field) at the 1912 Summer Olympics
Swedish male long-distance runners
Swedish male marathon runners
Olympic athletes of Sweden
Athletes from Stockholm